Everett Raymond Kinstler (August 5, 1926 – May 26, 2019) was an American artist, whose official portraits include Presidents Gerald Ford and Ronald Reagan. He was also a pulp and comic book artist, whose work appeared mainly in the 1940s and 1950s.

Life and work
Everett Kinstler was born in 1926 in New York City, the son of Essie and Joseph Kunstler. He started his career age 16, drawing comic books, paperback book covers, and book and magazine illustrations. He studied at the Art Students League of New York and later taught there (1969 – 1974). Kinstler also studied at the National Academy of Design.

Kinstler's influences included Alex Raymond, James Montgomery Flagg, Howard Chandler Christy, Milton Caniff, and Hal Foster.

Kinstler's pulp illustrations number in the hundreds, and cover many different genres including western, romance, crime, mystery, and war. Popular Publications was among the largest publishers of pulps in which his black-and-white illustrations appeared.

In comic books, he was particularly known for his western and romance comic work. He worked extensively for Avon Periodicals, as well as Ziff-Davis Publishing Company, Dell/Western Publishing, National Periodicals/DC Comics, St. John Publications, Atlas Comics/Marvel Comics, and Gilberton. The titles he spent the most time on were Avon's Realistic Romances, Witchcraft, and White Princess of the Jungle; and Ziff-Davis/St. John's Nightmare.

Beginning in the 1960s Kinstler shifted into the realm of portrait painting. He painted over 1200 portraits of leading figures in business, entertainment and government, including official portraits of eight U.S. Presidents, including Gerald Ford and Ronald Reagan. Perhaps America's most important working portrait artist, Kinstler held a Portraits, Inc. Lifetime Achievement Award for which a university scholarship is awarded each year in his name.

For more than 70 years, Kinstler lived and worked at The National Arts Club, of which he was a member. He painted over 2,000 of his subjects at his studio at the Club – including President Reagan, Katharine Hepburn, Tony Bennett, Salvador Dali, Carol Burnett, and Leonard Bernstein – and many of his works are included in its permanent collection. In the fall of 2018, he was honored at the Club’s 120th anniversary celebration for his outstanding career and commitment to the arts.

Among Kinstler's pupils were Michael Shane Neal, Dawn Whitelaw, Johanna Spinks, and Loryn Brazier.

He died from heart failure in Bridgeport, CT on May 26, 2019 at the age of 92.

Awards
 Elected to the National Academy of Design, in 1970
 Copley Medal from the Smithsonian National Portrait Gallery, in 1999
 Inkpot Award, in 2006

Comics bibliography (selected) 
As either cover artist, interior penciller/inker or both:

Avon Periodicals 
 Butch Cassidy and the Wild Bunch
 Jesse James
 Kit Carson
 Geronimo 
 Last of the Comanches 
 Western Bandits
 Wild Bill Hickok 
 The Masked Bandit 
 The Dalton Boys
 Sheriff Bob Dixon's Chuck Wagon
 Realistic Romances 
 Romantic Love
 Intimate Confessions
 Prison Break
 Eerie
 Murderous Gangsters
 Prison Riot 
 War Dogs of the U.S. Army
 Boy Detective 
 Space Detective 
 Pancho Villa 
 Phantom Witch Doctor 
 White Princess of the Jungle

Dell Comics 
 Zorro 
 Four Color
 #491: Silvertip
 #534: Ernest Haycox's Western Marshall
 #651: Luke Short's King Colt
 #723: Santiago

Other publishers 
 Flash Comics (National Periodicals)
 The Black Terror (Nedor Comics)
 The Black Hood (MLJ Comics)
 All-American Comics (All-American Publications)
 Blazing Sixguns (I. W. Publications)
 Wyatt Earp (Marvel Comics)
 Cinderella Love (Ziff-Davis/St. John Publications)
 Nightmare (Ziff-Davis/St. John Publications)
 Perfect Love (Ziff-Davis/St. John Publications)
 Strange Worlds (Atlas Comics)
 The World Around Us (Gilberton)
 Mystery Comics (Standard Comics)
 Thrilling Comics (Standard Comics)

Gallery

Major exhibitions 

 America Creative, Vanderbilt University Fine Arts Gallery, Nashville, TN (2018)

References

External links
 
 
 samples of Kinstler's comics work
 Everett Kinstler biography on Lambiek

1926 births
2019 deaths
21st-century American painters
21st-century male artists
20th-century American painters
American male painters
American portrait painters
American art educators
Art Students League of New York alumni
Painters from New York City
Golden Age comics creators
Science fiction artists
Members of The Lambs Club